The Taichung Suns are a Taiwanese professional basketball team based in Taichung City, Taiwan. The team is coached by Chris Gavina, with Wang Wei-Chieh as the general manager. The Suns were founded in 2021 and won 0 T1 League championship.

There have been 3 head coaches for the Taichung Suns franchise and haven't won any T1 League championship.

Key

Coaches
Note: Statistics are correct through the end of the 2021–22 T1 League season.

References

T1 League head coaches
Taichung Suns